Seasons of the Year, also called The Seasons or Four Seasons, is a 1975 Soviet–Armenian short documentary film, directed and written by Artavazd Peleshyan. It was his second and last collaboration with cinematographer Mikhail Vartanov, after Autumn Pastoral (1971).

Production

Seasons of the Year was filmed in black-and-white on 35 mm film in the Armenian SSR. It was Peleshyan's first film not using archive footage.

Synopsis

The film depicts the struggles of an isolated Armenian farming community against the elements. Armenian folk music is mixed with Vivaldi's Four Seasons. We see the villagers raising sheep and cattle, rolling haystacks down a hillside, dealing with rain and storms, celebrating a wedding, and sliding down a snowy hill while carrying sheep.

Release
Seasons of the Year was released in 1975. Decades later it became critically admired in the West, showing at the 40th Berlin International Film Festival (1990), CPH:DOX (2003), the 68th Venice International Film Festival (2011) and the International Documentary Film Festival Amsterdam (2012 and 2021). The scene of farmers rolling haystacks down a deep hill have become iconic.

Legacy

Andrei Ujică listed it among his favourite films, calling it "not a frame too short, not a frame too long." Verena Paravel also described seeing it on her first day of film school, calling it "the beginning of a cognitive and creative revolution for me." Ian Christie has written that Seasons of the Year is a "a vivid calendar of land and animal husbandry," comparing it to Salt for Svanetia (1930).

It was listed at #47 on Sight & Sound's list of the Critics’ 50 Greatest Documentaries of All Time, and finished #14 on the Filmmakers' list.

References

External links
 

1975 documentary films
Armenian short films
Films set in Armenia
Films shot in Armenia
Soviet black-and-white films
Armenian black-and-white films
Black-and-white documentary films
Documentary films about agriculture
Documentary films about the Soviet Union
Documentary films about nature
Armenian documentary films